New Hope is an unincorporated community and census-designated place in Nelson County, Kentucky, United States. Its population was 129 as of the 2010 census. New Hope has a post office with ZIP code 40052, which opened on April 5, 1844.

Geography

Demographics

References

Unincorporated communities in Nelson County, Kentucky
Unincorporated communities in Kentucky
Census-designated places in Nelson County, Kentucky
Census-designated places in Kentucky